The Vonckists were a political faction during the Brabant Revolution led by Jan Frans Vonck, opposed to the more conservative "Statists".

History
The group emerged from the secret society Pro aris et focis in the 1780s, and by 1789 had become a distinct faction.  The Vonckists called for a popular government along the model seen during the French Revolution. After the proclamation of the United Belgian States in January 1790, the Vonckists were denounced as anticlerical by the Statists and many were hunted down by mobs in what was known as the "Summer Terror". Jan Frans Vonck was forced into exile in France.

References

United Belgian States
Liberalism in Belgium
Republicanism in Belgium